Arjrud (also Romanized as Arjrūd and Arjarūd) is a village in Shahsavan Kandi Rural District, in the Central District of Saveh County, Markazi Province, Iran. At the 2006 census, its population was 40, in 15 families.

References 

Populated places in Saveh County